Pranlal Kharsani (19 June 1926 – 20 May 2016), better known by his stage name P. Kharsani, was a Gujarati stage, television and film actor.

Biography
Pranlal Devjibhai Kharsani was born on 19 June 1926 in Bhatwada area near Kalol, Gujarat. He was known for his comic roles but had played other characters also. He was active in films from 1958 to 2008 and for 60 years in theatre. He acted in about hundred Gujarati films and television serials and more than 75 plays. He had written, directed and produced several plays. He died on 20 May 2016 following kidney disease in Ahmedabad.

His memoirs, P. Kharsani no Vesh, were published in June 2015.

Recognition
He had received several awards and felicitations. He received the Best Actor Award for three consecutive years from 1955 to 1957 from Bombay State government, the Gaurav Puraskar from Gujarat State government in 1989, the Pandit Omkarnath Thakur Award in 1996, the award from the Gujarat Film Development Corporation in 1997, a public felicitation by Ahmedabad Municipal Corporation in 2013,  the Natraj Award in April 2016.

Selected plays
 Patta ni Jod (1958)
 Malela Jeev
 Parnya Chhata Kunvara
 Aram Rajya (Bhavai)
 Chitthi 
 Pdada Pachhal
 Hu Kaik Kari Besish
  Maf Karjo, Aa Natak Nahi Thay
 Akhil Brahmand Ma Ek Tu Stree Khari
 Panch Minute Ni Paranetar
 Ranchhode Rann Chhodyu
 Rajane Game Te Rani
 Mamaji No Morcho

Selected filmography
 Kalapi (1966)
 Madi Jaya nu Mameru
 Nari Tu Narayani
 Lakho Fulani
 Goral Garasani
 Narmadane Kanthe
 Bhathiji Maharaj
 Mena Gurjari
 Nasib ni Balihari
 Preet Pangre Chori Chori
 Bhav ni bhavai

References

1926 births
2016 deaths
Indian male stage actors
Indian theatre directors
Indian male musical theatre actors
Gujarati theatre
Male actors from Ahmedabad
Gujarati people
20th-century dramatists and playwrights
Male actors in Gujarati-language films
Writers from Ahmedabad
20th-century Indian male actors
Deaths from kidney disease